Trichloroethyl chloroformate is used in organic synthesis for the introduction of the trichloroethyl chloroformate (Troc) protecting group for amines, thiols and alcohols.  It readily cleaves vs other carbamates and can be used in an overall protecting group strategy.

The troc group is traditionally removed via Zn insertion in the presence of acetic acid, resulting in elimination and decarboxylation.

Amine protection – 2,2,2-Trichloroethoxycarbonyl (Troc) 

2,2,2-Trichloroethoxycarbonyl (Troc) group is largely used as a protecting group for amines in organic synthesis.

Most common amine protection methods 
 2,2,2-Trichloroethyl chloroformate, pyridine or aqueous sodium hydroxide at ambient temperature

 Electrolysis

 Deprotection using zinc metal

References 

Chloroformates
Protecting groups
Reagents for organic chemistry